UFC 262: Oliveira vs. Chandler was a mixed martial arts event produced by the Ultimate Fighting Championship that took place on May 15, 2021 at the Toyota Center in Houston, Texas, United States.

Background 
A UFC Lightweight Championship bout for the vacant title between former three-time Bellator Lightweight World Champion Michael Chandler and Charles Oliveira headlined the event. Former champion Khabib Nurmagomedov announced his retirement immediately after defending his title at UFC 254 last October, citing his father's death from complications related to COVID-19 in July as the main reason behind it. Despite his announcement, the title was never officially vacated as UFC President Dana White said several times that he believed Nurmagomedov would still fight again. White finally conceded on March 19 as he confirmed Nurmagomedov's retirement.

A welterweight bout between Leon Edwards and former UFC Lightweight Championship challenger Nate Diaz (also The Ultimate Fighter 5 lightweight winner) was expected to take place at this event. It would've marked the first five-round non-title co-main event in UFC history. However, Diaz pulled out due to a minor injury in early May and the bout was postponed to UFC 263.

A flyweight bout between former UFC Flyweight Championship challenger Alex Perez and Matt Schnell was scheduled for the event. However, Perez was forced to pull out due to undisclosed reasons. He was replaced by Rogério Bontorin and the bout took place at bantamweight. At the weigh-ins, Bontorin weighed in at 137 pounds, one pound over the division's non-title fight limit. The bout proceeded at catchweight and he was fined 20% of his purse, which went to Schnell.

Joel Álvarez was scheduled to face Christos Giagos in a lightweight bout. However, Álvarez was removed from the bout in early May due to alleged visa issues that restricted his travel. Giagos faced returning veteran Sean Soriano instead.

A middleweight bout between Jack Hermansson and Edmen Shahbazyan was expected to take place at this event. However, the bout was postponed to take place one week later at UFC Fight Night: Font vs. Garbrandt due to a COVID-19 case in Hermansson's camp.

On May 14, it was announced that the UFC would be increasing bonuses (Fight of the Night and Performance of the Night) from $50,000 to $75,000. This increase was for this event only and was made at the request of former interim lightweight champion Tony Ferguson (also The Ultimate Fighter: Team Lesnar vs. Team dos Santos welterweight winner), who received a raucous response from the audience in attendance at the UFC 262 pre-fight press conference when he made the proposal.

Results

Bonus awards
The following fighters received $75,000 bonuses.
Fight of the Night: Edson Barboza vs. Shane BurgosPerformance of the Night: Charles Oliveira and  Christos Giagos'''

Aftermath
In June 2021, Bontorin was notified by USADA due to a potential doping violation. He tested positive for hydrochlorothiazide, a banned diuretic, in an out-of-competition urine sample in May 2021. Following notification of his positive test, Bontorin provided open containers of two dietary supplements he obtained from a Brazilian compounding pharmacy that he was using prior to his positive test for analysis by a WADA-accredited laboratory. Although no prohibited substances were listed on the supplement product labels, the analysis revealed the presence of HCTZ in the products. He was given a three month suspension that began on 1 May and his win was overturned to a no contest.

See also 

 List of UFC events
 List of current UFC fighters
 2021 in UFC

References 

Ultimate Fighting Championship events
2021 in mixed martial arts
May 2021 sports events in the United States
Mixed martial arts in Houston
Sports competitions in Houston
2021 in sports in Texas